Hannah Margaret Penn ( Callowhill; 11 February 1671 – 20 December  1726) was an Anglo-American governor. The second wife of Pennsylvania founder William Penn, she effectively administered the Province of Pennsylvania for six years after her husband suffered a series of strokes, and then for another eight years after her husband's death. She served as acting proprietor from 1712 until her death in 1726.

Life 
Hannah Margaret Callowhill was born in Bristol, England, the daughter of Thomas Callowhill, a merchant there, and Anna (or Hannah) Hollister. A Quaker, she married William Penn on March 5, 1696, when she was 25 and he was 52.  She was pregnant with their first of eight children when the couple embarked from England for their three-month voyage to America in 1699. She lived in great style, both in Philadelphia and at Pennsbury Manor, a beautiful estate located in Bucks County, on the Delaware River.

When William Penn died at age 73 on July 30, 1718, his will gave Hannah Penn full control of the colony and his fortune.  William Penn's oldest son by his first marriage, William Penn Jr., sought to dismiss his father's will in order to obtain control of the colony. His suit was unsuccessful, and Hannah Penn remained in charge of the colony until she died from a stroke in her son's house in London at age 55.

Her deputy in Pennsylvania from 1718 till 1727 was Sir William Keith.

Children
The couple had nine children:

 Unnamed daughter (born and died 1697)
 John Penn ("the American") (28 January 1700 – 25 October 1746), never married
 Thomas Penn (20 March 1702 – 21 March 1775), married Lady Juliana Fermore, fourth daughter of Thomas, first Earl of Pomfret
 Hannah Penn (1703–1706) 
 Margaret Penn (7 November 1704–February 1751), married Thomas Freame (1701/02-1746) nephew of John Freame, founder of Barclays Bank
 Richard Penn Sr. (17 January 1706 – 4 February 1771) 
 Dennis Penn (26 February 1707 – 1723) 
 Hannah Margarita Penn (1708–March 1708)
 Louis Penn

Legacy
Hannah Penn is one of the few individuals and the first woman granted the status of Honorary Citizen of the United States, awarded her by Presidential Proclamation by an Act of Congress (PL. 98-516) by Ronald Reagan on November 28, 1984.

When William Penn was laying out the city of Philadelphia in the early 1680s, he named Callowhill Street in his wife's honor. Similarly, a street in Perkasie, Pennsylvania, is also named in her honor. A middle school in York, Pennsylvania, is named in her honor.

Pennsylvania Governor, Tom Corbett, named March 12, 2013 "Hannah Callowhill Penn Day."

Governor Corbett and Mrs. Susan Corbett commissioned a posthumous portrait of Hannah Penn by Pennsylvania portrait artist Ellen Cooper. The portrait was unveiled at a ceremony at the Pennsylvania capitol during Women's History Month, March 19, 2014. After being publicly displayed in the governor's reception room for several months, on January 15, 2015, the portrait was hung in the Pennsylvania governor's office among portraits of other early leaders of Pennsylvania. However, as of March 2015 the portrait is in storage; Governor Tom Wolf asked for it to be moved into the governor's reception room, but he said because of safety concerns it was returned to the Historical and Museum Commission. According to Penn Live, "It is likely that it will be sent, for a time, to Pennsbury Manor, the estate from which the Penns first governed the new colony. Then, it is headed to the state museum for an exhibit on Iconic Stories of Pennsylvania."

On March 19, 2014, the Pennsylvania Commission for Women awarded the first Hannah Penn Leadership Awards to honor Pennsylvania women who have been outstanding mentors and role models through their leadership, service and commitment to empowering women and girls in the commonwealth.

References

External links

Presidential Proclamation 5284 
Sketch of Hannah Penn
Pennsylvania Historical Marker and portrait

1671 births
1726 deaths
Colonial American women
People from Bristol
English Quakers
People of colonial Pennsylvania
Hannah Callowhill
18th-century women rulers